Deconica aureicystidiata is a species of mushroom in the family Strophariaceae. It has been found in Mount Halimun Salak National Park and Gunung Gede Pangrango National Park in Java, Indonesia.

References

Strophariaceae
Fungi described in 2006
Fungi of Asia